Cuckoo Rock is a tor-like igneous rock outcrop in West Devon. It is located to the east of Burrator Reservoir and to the south east of Down Tor, at a height of 362 m.

The origin of the name is disputed. Some claim it is that the shape of the top of the rock, while others say it is as the rock was an ideal point from which to hear cuckoos in spring.

Cuckoo Rock is made of granite and was formerly used as a hideaway for smuggled goods, especially liquor.

References

Landforms of Devon
Dartmoor
Rock formations of England
Tors of Dartmoor